Victor da Silva Medeiros (born February 20, 1989), commonly known as Vitinho is a Brazilian former football player. His cousin Eric Pereira was also a footballer.

Honours
Gaz Metan Mediaş
Liga II: 2015–16
Real Estelí
Nicaraguan Primera División: 2016–17

References

External links
 
 

1989 births
Living people
Brazilian footballers
Brazilian expatriate footballers
Marília Atlético Clube players
Association football forwards
Expatriate footballers in Romania
Brazilian expatriate sportspeople in Romania
Liga I players
Liga II players
CS Gaz Metan Mediaș players
Expatriate footballers in Nicaragua
Real Estelí F.C. players